The following page lists all coal-fired power stations (including lignite-fired) that are  or larger current net capacity, which are currently operational or under construction. If a station also  has units which do not burn coal, only coal-fired capacity is listed.

Coal power stations

See also

List of least carbon efficient power stations
List of coal-fired power stations in the United States

Sources

References